Bullfighter and the Lady is a 1951 drama romance sport film directed and written by Budd Boetticher starring Robert Stack, Joy Page and Gilbert Roland. Filmed on location in Mexico, the film focused on the realities of the dangerous sport of bullfighting. During production, one stunt man died. Boetticher, who had experience in bullfighting, used a semidocumentary approach in filming the sport and the lives of matadors.

Plot 
Chuck Regan (Robert Stack), a young American film producer travels to Mexico, where he takes up bullfighting to impress a local beauty, Anita de la Vega (Joy Page). Manolo Estrada (Gilbert Roland), an aging matador, reluctantly agrees to teach the brash, self-centered Regan.

Cast 
Robert Stack as John "Chuck" Regan
Joy Page as Anita de la Vega
Gilbert Roland as Manolo Estrada
Virginia Grey as Lisbeth Flood
John Hubbard as Barney Flood
Katy Jurado as Chelo Estrada
Ismael Pérez as Panchito
Rodolfo Acosta as Juan
Ruben Padilla as Dr. Sierra
Darío Ramírez as Pepe Mora
Paul Fix as Joseph Jamison (uncredited) 
Ward Bond as Narrator (voice) (uncredited)

Production
The film was originally called Torero. Boetticher had been a bullfighter and told his life story to Ray Nazarro when working as an assistant director to the latter at Columbia. Boetticher says he wrote it down and Nazarro typed it up and sold the project to Dore Schary at MGM. He says this it why Nazarro has credit.

Boetticher says the film got made because John Wayne liked the story. He says Wayne "and John Ford cut 42 minutes out of" the film "so that it would be less than 90 minutes, a "B" picture. It took me forty years to get it back the way I wanted it.. It was a helluva blow, I tell you."

Reception 
Bullfighter earned Boetticher his only Academy Award nomination, for Best Story, which he shared with co-writer Ray Nazarro. Together with Seven Men from Now, Boetticher regarded Bullfighter as one of "the two best films I ever made." 

The complete 124 minute version of The Bullfighter and the Lady was released on DVD and Blu-ray Disc on July 30, 2013.

Alternate Versions 
For the film's American theatrical release, Bullfighter was cut to 87 minutes in order to share a double bill. The UCLA Film Archive recently restored the film to its full 124 minute length.

References

External links 

 

1951 films
American black-and-white films
Batjac Productions films
Films scored by Victor Young
Films directed by Budd Boetticher
Films produced by John Wayne
1951 romantic drama films
Republic Pictures films
1950s English-language films
Films set in Mexico
Bullfighting films
American romantic drama films
1950s American films